Washington Junior High School and Jefferson Grade School is an historic school building located in Clinton, Iowa, United States.  Des Moines architects Karl Keffer and Earl E. Jones designed the building in the Art Deco style. A. H. Morrell served as the associate architect.  The original portion of the building was constructed from 1933 to 1935 by Ringland-Johnson Company.  It is a large, two-story structure with a brick exterior and stone trim and accent panels.  The relief of geometric designs at the entry is of particular interest.  Additions were added to the rear of the building in 1952 and in 1972.  A contemporary Jefferson Elementary School was built on the same property and replaced this school building in 2006.  The building was used as a middle school until late 2014 when a new Clinton Middle School was completed.  The former school building was listed on the National Register of Historic Places in 2015.  Plans call for the building to be converted into senior apartments.

References

School buildings completed in 1935
Art Deco architecture in Iowa
Buildings and structures in Clinton, Iowa
Defunct schools in Iowa
Former school buildings in the United States
School buildings on the National Register of Historic Places in Iowa
National Register of Historic Places in Clinton County, Iowa
1935 establishments in Iowa